Massimo Meola (born December 25, 1953 in Biella) is an Italian former footballer who played as a goalkeeper. He played 4 games in Serie A in the 1975–76 season for A.S. Roma.

References

1953 births
Living people
Italian footballers
Association football goalkeepers
A.S. Roma players
Serie A players
A.S.D. La Biellese players